The Micromax In Note 1 is an Android smartphone developed by the Indian Smartphone manufacturer Micromax Informatics. Announced on November 3, 2020 and released on November 24, 2020, the In Note 1 marks the re-entry of the company into the Indian smartphone market.

Specifications

Hardware 
The In Note 1 is powered by a Mediatek Helio G85 SoC including an octa-core 2.0 GHz CPU, an ARM G52 MC2 GPU. The internal storage is of 64 GB or 128 GB .

The In Note 1 features a 6.67-inch IPS LCD punch hole display with a 1080× 2400 FHD+ pixel display resolution and a pixel density of  395 ppi. The rear camera has a quad camera setup of 48MP+5MP+2MP+2MP sensors. Camera modes include night mode, HDR, Panorama, AI Scene Detection, Beauty, Pro, GIF, Time lapse, Slow-Motion and Portrait mode. The front camera features 16 MP and f/2.0 aperture.

Software 
The In Note 1 is originally shipped with Android 10 and runs Stock Android. Micromax officially promised for software upgrade but nothing is happening from past 1.5 year except a security patch provided Recently.
Current security patch - 05/07/22
It's seems to be fake promise of Android Update done by the co-founder of Micromax Rahul Sharma.

See also 

 Micromax Informatics 
 YU Televentures
 Android 10

References

External links 
 Micromax IN Note 1

Mobile phones introduced in 2020
Micromax Mobile
Mobile phones with multiple rear cameras